The 2017 WAFL season was the 133rd season of the various incarnations of the West Australian Football League (WAFL). The season commenced on 18 March 2017 and concluded with the 2017 WAFL Grand Final on 24 September 2017.

Ladder

For the full list of results for the home-and-away season, refer to the attached reference.

Clubs

Finals series

Elimination and Qualifying Finals

Semi-finals

Preliminary final

Grand Final

References 

West Australian Football League seasons
WAFL